German singer Nina Hagen has released seventeen studio albums, fourteen compilation albums, one soundtrack album and two extended plays. Hagen first signed with CBS Records in 1976 with her group Nina Hagen Band. In 1982, she detached herself from the band and released three solo albums on the label. In 1986, her contract with CBS expired and was not renewed. In 1989, Hagen signed with Mercury Records, on which label she released three new albums.

Albums

Studio albums

Live albums

Compilation albums

Extended plays

Singles

1970s

1980s

1990s–present

As featured artist

References

Discography
Hagen, Nina
Hagen, Nina